The family of Imran Khan, the former Prime Minister of Pakistan and former captain of the Pakistan cricket team, is the former First Family of Pakistan. Imran Khan was born on 5 October 1952 in Lahore to father Ikramullah Khan Niazi, a civil engineer, and mother Shaukat Khanum. He grew up as the only son in the family, with four sisters. The family are ethnically of Pashtun origin. Paternally, Khan belongs to the Niazi Pashtun tribe which has long been settled in Mianwali in northwestern Punjab. Khan's mother hailed from the Burki Pashtun tribe settled in Jalandhar, Punjab, which emigrated a few centuries ago from South Waziristan in the tribal areas of northwest Pakistan. Khan's maternal family has produced several great cricketers, the most prominent of whom are Javed Burki and Majid Khan.

From 1995 to 2004, Imran Khan was married to Jemima Goldsmith, a British socialite turned writer and activist, and member of the influential Goldschmidt family of England. They have two sons from the marriage Sulaiman Isa Khan (born 1996) and Kasim Khan (born 1999). The marriage ended amicably in divorce in 2004. In early 2015, Khan announced his second marriage to the British Pakistani journalist Reham Khan. The marriage lasted nine months and ended in divorce on 30 October 2015. In 2018, he married Bushra Maneka, who was previously his spiritual mentor.

Elementary family

Wives

Jemima Goldsmith

On 16 May 1995, Khan married Jemima Goldsmith, in a traditional Pakistani wedding ceremony in Paris. A month later, on 21 June, they were married again in a civil ceremony at the Richmond registry office in England, followed by a reception at the Goldsmiths' house in Surrey which was attended by London's elite. The wedding was named by the media as "The wedding of the century".

Jemima Marcelle Goldsmith is the eldest child of Lady Annabel Vane-Tempest-Stewart and Billionaire financier Sir James Goldsmith, who was one of richest men in UK. Goldsmith enrolled at the University of Bristol in 1993 and studied English, but dropped out when she was married in 1995. She eventually completed her bachelor's degree in March 2002 with upper second-class honours. In 2003, she received her MA in Middle Eastern Studies at the School of Oriental and African Studies, University of London, focusing on Modern Trends in Islam.

The marriage, described as "tough" by Khan, ended in 2004 after nine years. Shortly after their marriage, Imran and Jemima arrived at Zaman Park in Lahore from their honeymoon at one of the Goldsmiths' farms in Spain, and were greeted by international and local reporters. It was also announced that Jemima had converted to Islam and she would use 'Khan' as her last name.

As an agreement of his marriage, Khan spent four months a year in England and the rest in Lahore. The marriage produced two sons, Sulaiman Isa (born 18 November 1996) and Kasim (born 10 April 1999). During the marriage Jemima actively participated in a Khan led charity drive for the Shaukat Khanum Memorial Cancer Hospital & Research Centre and also supported her husband in starting his initial political career.

Rumours circulated that the couple's marriage was in crisis. Jemima placed an advertisement in Pakistan newspapers to deny them. It read: "Whilst it is true that I am currently studying for a master's degree at the School of Oriental and African Studies in London, it is certainly not true to say that Imran and I are having difficulties in our marriage. This is a temporary arrangement." On 22 June 2004, it was announced that the couple had divorced, ending the nine-year marriage because it was "difficult for Jemima to adapt to life in Pakistan" despite both their best efforts.

The marriage ended amicably. Khan described the six months leading to the divorce and the six months after as the hardest years of his life. After the divorce Jemima returned to Britain with the boys. According to the divorce settlement, Khan's sons visit him in Pakistan during their school holidays while he stays with his former mother-in-law, Lady Annabel Goldsmith, when he comes to London to see them.

Reham Khan

In January 2015, Imran Khan married British Pakistani journalist and television anchor Reham Khan, after months of speculation. The marriage was conducted via a simple nikah ceremony at Khan's residence in Bani Gala. The marriage ended in divorce nine months later, in October 2015.

Reham is an ethnic Pashtun, belonging to the Lughmani sub-clan of the Swati tribe. She comes from Mansehra in the Hazara region of Khyber Pakhtunkhwa, and speaks the local dialect Hindko, in addition to Pashto and Urdu.

Bushra Bibi

Khan married Bushra Bibi, who was in her 40s, on 18 February 2018 at his residence in Lahore. She is known for her connection to Sufism; prior to her marriage with Khan, she had been his spiritual mentor (murshid). Bushra has two sons and three daughters, to whom Imran is a step-father, from her first marriage to Khawar Maneka.

Children

Sulaiman Isa 
Khan's eldest son with Jemima named Sulaiman Isa was born in November 1996 at the Portland Hospital in London. In 2016, Sulaiman led the electoral campaign in the youth wing of his maternal uncle Zac Goldsmith for the 2016 London mayoral election.

Kasim Khan 
Imran's second son with Jemima named Kasim was born on 10 April 1999 in England. Following their divorce, Jemima returned to England with their sons. As per a mutual settlement, Khan's sons visit him in Pakistan during their school holidays while he stays with his former mother-in-law, Lady Annabel Goldsmith, when he visits London to see them.

Tyrian Jade 
In addition to these, Khan has an illegitimate daughter named Tyrian Jade with his former girlfriend Sita White, daughter of the English businessman Gordon White. Tyrian was born in June 1992 at the Cedars Sinai Medical Center in Los Angeles. She was noted for her resemblance to Khan. Sita White claimed that Khan initially refused to accept Tyrian as his child because she was a daughter and urged White to have an abortion. After White took legal action against Khan in 1997, the Califorinian court ruled that Tyrian was his biological daughter. Khan initially denied these allegations and willed for a paternity test. After Sita White died in 2004, Khan agreed to accept Tyrian as his biological child and welcomed her into his family.  In 2015, Tyrian celebrated her birthday with her step-brothers Sulaiman and Qasim.

Alleged children 
Khan's second wife Reham Nayyar claimed that Khan had five illegitimate children. These allegations were published shortly before the 2018 Pakistani general election, leading to claims that its publication was intended to damage Imran Khan's electoral prospects.

Immediate family

Parents
Khan was born in Lahore, the only son of Ikramullah Khan Niazi, a civil engineer, and his wife Shaukat Khanum the daughter of Ahmad Hassan Khan. Khan in his childhood and youth was a quiet and shy boy. Khan grew up with his four sisters in relatively affluent (upper middle-class) circumstances and received a privileged education. Khan's parents were moderate and practicing Muslims.
 
Khan's father, Ikramullah Khan Niazi, was born in Mianwali on 24 April 1922. He was a civil engineer who graduated from the Imperial College London in 1946. Ikramullah was a staunch supporter of the Pakistan Movement during the days of the British Raj and was "fiercely anti-colonial"; he would tell off local waiters at the Lahore Gymkhana Club who would speak to him in English. He worked in the Pakistan Public Works Department. He was also a philanthropist, founding a charity called the Pakistan Educational Society which "funded the university education of underprivileged but talented children." Ikramullah Niazi served as a board member of the Shaukat Khanum Memorial Cancer Hospital & Research Centre during his later years. He died on 19 March 2008 at the age of 85 from pneumonia, after a protracted illness for which he was being treated at Shaukat Khanum cancer hospital. He is buried at the family's ancestral graveyard in Mianwali. He was one of the hundreds of people Zulfiqar Ali Bhutto had removed from civil service on corruption charges.  

Khan's mother, Shaukat Khanum, was a housewife. She was born in Jalandhar, before the partition of India. He credits his mother as having played a deep influential role in his upbringing. In 1985, she died due to cancer. The helplessness and personal experience of seeing his mother diagnosed with cancer, which became the cause of her death, motivated Khan to build a cancer hospital in Pakistan where those who could not afford expensive care could be treated well. In 1994, the Shaukat Khanum Memorial Cancer Hospital & Research Centre was founded by Khan in Lahore, and named in memory of his mother. A second Shaukat Khanum cancer hospital has been inaugurated in Peshawar, while plans are underway for a third hospital to be located in Karachi.

Siblings

Khan has four sisters: Rubina Khanum, Aleema Khanum, Uzma Khanum and Rani Khanum.

Khan's elder sister, Rubina Khanum, is an alumnus of the London School of Economics and held a senior post with the United Nations.

Aleema Khanum is an entrepreneur and philanthropist who is the founder of a Lahore-based textile buying house, CotCom Sourcing (Pvt.) Ltd. She graduated with an MBA from the Lahore University of Management Sciences in 1989. Her textile buying house has served textile retailers and agents across the globe, and maintains representative offices in Karachi and New York. Aleema served as marketing director for the Shaukat Khanum Memorial Trust, and played an instrumental role in fundraising efforts for the hospital. She is a member of the board of governors of the hospital. She is also a member of the board of the Imran Khan Foundation and Namal Education Foundation, and several charitable and social welfare organisations including the Hameed Muggo Trust and the SAARC Association of Home-Based Workers.

Of Khan's other sisters, Uzma Khanum is a qualified surgeon based in Lahore while Rani Khanum is a university graduate who coordinates charity activities.

Shortly after her marriage to Imran Khan, Jemima acknowledged the support she received from Khan's sisters while adjusting to life in Lahore and described them as "educated, strong women, with lives of their own."

Paternal family

Khan's father belonged to the Niazi Pashtun tribe, who were long settled in Mianwali in northwestern Punjab. The Niazis had come to the subcontinent with invading Afghan tribes during the fifteenth century. Imran identifies Haibat Khan Niazi as a paternal ancestor, a sixteenth century military general of Sher Shah Suri and later governor of Punjab. His paternal family hail from the Shermankhel sub-clan of the Niazis. The Niazis mainly speak Saraiki and are based in Mianwali and surrounding areas, where family and tribal networks are strong and where, according to Khan, "even third cousins know each other".

Grandparents
Imran Khan's paternal grandfather, Azeem Khan Niazi, was a physician. The ancestral haveli (mansion) of Khan's paternal family is located in Shermankhel Mohallah, Mianwali, and is known as Azeem Manzil (named after his paternal grandfather, who built it), where Khan's extended relatives still reside. It is spread over an area of ten kanals, and the family's ancestral graveyard where Imran's paternal grandfather, grandmother as well his father are buried, lies nearby.

Khan began his political campaign from Mianwali in 2002, winning his first seat in the National Assembly from the city which he calls his hometown.

Uncles
Azeem Khan Niazi had four sons: Ikramullah Khan Niazi (Imran's father), Amanullah Khan Niazi, Zafarullah Khan Niazi and Faizullah Khan Niazi. Imran's paternal uncle Amanullah Khan Niazi was a lawyer and politician who was a senior member of the Muslim League. Zafarullah Khan Niazi was a businessman. Imran's father Ikramullah and uncles Zafarullah and Amanullah previously resided in the family haveli. It is now the property of Khan's cousin, Inamullah Niazi.

Cousins
Zafarullah Khan Niazi had several sons, including Khan's paternal cousin Inamullah Niazi; a politician and former parliamentarian who was a member of the Pakistan Muslim League (N) for nearly two decades, before becoming senior vice-president of Khan's Tehreek-e-Insaf in Punjab in 2013. He later rejoined the PML (N), following a dispute over election ticket distributions. Inamullah's brother and occasional columnist Hafizullah Niazi is also Imran's brother-in-law, through cousin marriage to Imran's sister. They have other brothers, including Irfanullah Niazi, Abdul Hafeez Niazi (a politician and former member of the Punjab provincial assembly), and their youngest brother, the late Najeebullah Khan Niazi, politician and former member of the Punjab provincial assembly.

According to Dawn, many members of Khan's paternal tribe, and particularly his cousins, have been traditional supporters of the PML-N, even after Khan founded his own party. The newspaper noted that Khan's ancestral home functioned "partially as a local office for the PML-N" and that instead of Khan, the family home featured posters of the Sharifs and pictures of other family members. Inamullah was reportedly unhappy when he was snubbed and not given an election ticket from the PTI's platform, causing Inamullah and his brothers to part ways with Khan and heavily criticise him on the media. Commenting on the bitter family politics, Khan once said: "What should I say? It is a family matter. They are my brothers, Hafizullah and Saeedullah, and their contributions to PTI are great. Inamullah was new to the party... but I did [what I thought was fair]."

Another cousin, Saeedullah Khan Niazi was the president of the PTI in Punjab. He also has a cousin, Ahmed Khan Niazi, who served as his head of security.

Maternal family

Khan's maternal family or Imran khan's mother Shaukat Khanum belonged to the Burki Pashtun tribe. The Burkis speak their own dialect, an Iranian language distinct from Pashto known as Ormuri (also called the Burki dialect). There are various theories about the origins of the Burkis, including one which states that they migrated from Turkish Kurdistan over at least eight centuries ago, and settled in the mountains of Kaniguram. Another theory, as discussed by Robert Leech (1838), ascribes a "Farsiwan" or "Tajik" origin with ancestry from Yemen, from whence they arrived in Afghanistan and were later brought to India along with the army of Mehmood Ghaznavi. According to Leech, the tribe had two divisions in Afghanistan's Logar Province; one in Baraki Rajan, which spoke Persian, and one in Baraki Barak, where they spoke the Burki dialect (also known as Ormuri). Leech added that the Burkis of Kaniguram spoke the Burki dialect, just like their kinsmen in Barak.

According to a tribal legend, they may have served as bodyguards for Mehmood Ghaznavi who conquered much of Afghanistan, Pakistan and parts of northern India in the eleventh century, and were awarded lands. They made their living as traders, taking horses and silk to India. Some members of the Burki tribe emigrated from Kaniguram around 1600 AD and formed a settlement in the city of Jalandhar (southeast of Amritsar and 40 miles from Lahore; now in Punjab, India), where Khan's mother was born. According to Khan, his maternal family had been based in Jalandhar for over 600 years before migrating to Pakistan after the partition of India. His mother's family played an instrumental role in establishing the Islamia College in Jalandhar.

Maternally, Khan is a descendant of the Sufi warrior-poet and inventor of the Pashto alphabet, Pir Roshan (also known as Bayazid Khan), a Burki born in Jalandhar who hailed from Kaniguram. According to a Burki historian, K. Hussain Zia, the Burki emigration from Kaniguram was prompted by a severe drought; "The elders decided that some people would have to leave in order for the others to survive. It was thus that 40 families bade farewell to Kaniguram. The entire population walked with them for some miles and watched from the top of a hill till they were out of sight." These forty caravans would eventually arrive in Jalandhar, an area which the Burkis were already acquainted with previously, on account of their trading routes to India via the Grand Trunk Road. In Jalandhar, the Burkis established fortified villages referred to as "bastis". To preserve their ethnic identity and keep their Pashtun culture intact in India, they did not marry outside their tribe. Khan's maternal family lived in twelve fortresses in an area in Jalandhar founded by the Burkis known as the Basti Pathan (lit. Pathan Colony). Khan's maternal grandfather, Ahmed Hasan Khan, was a civil servant and known to have hosted Quaid-e-Azam Muhammad Ali Jinnah, Founder of Pakistan, at Basti Pathan. Until the 18th century, the Jalandhar Burkis retained ties and trading links with their kinsmen back in Kaniguram. However, these links were cut off following local instability during Sikh resistance against the Mughal Empire. As a result of this, the Jalandhar Burkis lost much of their language and cultural traits, adopting the Punjabi language.

Following the partition of India and the independence of Pakistan in 1947, the entire Burki clan migrated to Lahore in Pakistan, escaping the carnage and violence that ensued during the partition. In Lahore, the Burkis settled in an affluent area which came to be known as Zaman Park, and it was here among his maternal family where Imran Khan spent much of his youth growing up. The area is named after Imran's maternal grandfather's brother (i.e. grand-uncle), Khan Bahadur Mohammed Zaman Khan, who settled in Lahore before the partition and was serving as postmaster general for the undivided Punjab Province. When the Burkis from Jalandhar arrived to Lahore, they took shelter in Zaman's house and eventually took up surrounding houses vacated by Hindus who left for India. Thus, all of Imran's maternal family established themselves in Zaman Park. Imran's parents built their house in the same area, which he now owns. Imran grew up playing cricket with his cousins in the neighbourhood. The name Zaman Park came from the presence of a park, around which the houses were located.

Imran Khan's maternal family is known for its sporting tradition; the Burki clan has produced a long line of cricketers and played an influential role in Pakistan's cricket history. Eight of his cousins played first-class cricket. The most prominent of them are Javed Burki and Majid Khan, who went on to represent the national team and served as captains. In total, up to forty members of the Burki tribe have at some point played first-class cricket in British India or Pakistan. Two of Imran's mother's cousins also captained the Pakistan national field hockey team.

Grandparents
Imran's maternal grandfather Ahmad Hasan Khan was born in 1883, and his father Ahmad Shah Khan(Imran's maternal great-grandfather) had also been a civil servant. He entered the Government College Lahore in 1900, and was reputed in sport, captaining the cricket and football teams at the college. After completing his studies, Ahmed entered the government service. At the height of his career in civil service, he served as the census commissioner of Punjab. He was posted in various areas, including a posting as a District Commissioner in Mianwali (the hometown of Imran Khan's paternal family).

Writing on his maternal grandmother, Khan said that his mother would "make us children go to see our maternal grandmother with our cousins every day for half an hour. These evenings with her were most enjoyable. She would know everything that was going on in our lives. In fact she would get involved in all our problems and we would tell her things that even our parents would not know." According to Khan, his grandmother died at the age of a hundred and "all her mental faculties were fully intact." He also writes that his grandmother died shortly after his own mother died in 1985, and that she might have lived longer but could not get over the loss; "my mother being her youngest child... It almost seemed as if she decided it was time for her to go. She refused to get out of bed and three months after my mother's death she passed away."

Uncles and aunts
Ahmed Hasan Khan had four daughters: the eldest, Iqbal Bano, followed by Mubarak and Shaukat (Imran's mother). Another sister is said to have died early. Ahmed Raza Khan (Imran's maternal uncle) was the only son. Lieutenant General Ahmed Raza was known affectionately by his friends as "Aghajan", and entered the military service. He also played fifteen first-class cricket matches in India and Pakistan, playing for Northern India followed by Punjab. He later served as a national selector at the Pakistan Cricket Board.

Imran's eldest maternal aunt, Iqbal Bano, was married to General Wajid Ali Khan Burki, a high-ranking military official and physician in the Pakistan Army. Imran's second aunt, Mubarak, was married to Jahangir Khan. Jahangir was a cricketer during the British Raj era who played for India and later served as a cricket administrator in Pakistan post-independence.

Cousins
Nausherwan Burki is a US-based physician and pulmonologist who played an instrumental role in setting up Imran's Shaukat Khanum Cancer Hospital and serves in its board of governors; he was also among the original founders of the Pakistan Tehreek-e-Insaf in 1996. Wajid and Iqbal Bano's second son, Javed Burki briefly played cricket for Pakistan during the 1960s and also captained the national side. After retiring from cricket, Javed served as secretary to the Ministry of Water and Power of the Government of Pakistan. Their third son Jamshed Burki, was a retired army major and civil servant who served as a political agent in the Khyber Agency of the tribal areas, among many other important posts, and went on to become the Interior Secretary of Pakistan.

Jahangir Khan and Mubarak's eldest son Asad Jahangir Khan won an Oxford Blue in cricket and was a first-class cricketer in Pakistan. Their second son, Majid Khan became a cricket legend who captained the national side of Pakistan during the 1970s. Majid's son Bazid Khan is also a cricketer who has played at the national level. Another distant cousin, Humayun Zaman, played first-class cricket between 1956 and 1971.

Extended family
Imran's nephew Hassan Niazi headed the Insaf Students Federation, the student wing of the PTI. He also has many other nephews. PTI's Additional General Secretary Saifullah Niazi belongs to the Niazi clan and is a distant relative. Pakistani cricket captain Misbah-ul-Haq also belongs to the Niazi tribe in Mianwali and shares blood relations with Imran Khan paternally. One of his father's cousins, Sajjad Sarwar Niazi, was a poet and music composer who served as the director of the Peshawar Radio Station, while his daughter Nahid Niazi earned fame as a singer. Nahid was married to a prominent Bengali music composer Moslehudin, and her sister Najma Niazi was also a popular singer.

Shaukat Khanum's cousin Mrs. Lt Col. Zaheer-ud-Din, has two sons Lt. Col. Muhammad Omer Khan and Muhammad Ali Khan, who is a banker serving as a Vice President in MCB Bank Limited. Her grandson, Moin Khan holds a record for traveling from California, America to Lahore, Pakistan on a sports bike.

Imran's uncle Jahangir's brother-in-law Baqa Jilani also played cricket for India. Jilani's nephew, Sherandaz Khan, was a first-class cricketer, and another distant cousin of Imran from the Burki tribe. He was also the first bowler to dismiss Imran in first-class cricket. The Pakistani economist Shahid Javed Burki is a nephew of Wajid Ali Khan Burki and an extended relative of Imran.

Imran Khan is said to be a distant cousin of the British-Pakistani heart surgeon Hasnat Khan, who had a relationship with Lady Diana. He is also a cousin of one of Pakistan's leading English-language columnists, Khaled Ahmed, who belongs to the Burki tribe. Lawyer and PTI member Hamid Khan is also a relative.

Imran's great-uncle Khan Salamuddin and many members of Salamuddin's extended family also made a name in cricket.

Many family relatives of Imran, from both the paternal and maternal sides, have served in the Pakistan Armed Forces. Major-General Bilal Omar Khan, who died in the 2009 Rawalpindi mosque attack was from Khan's maternal family. Another extended relative, General Zahid Ali Akbar Khan, was an engineering officer in the Pakistan Army, director of the nuclear Project-706, and later chairman of the Pakistan Cricket Board.

In-law families

Goldsmith family

Jemima was the eldest child of the Anglo-French billionaire and business tycoon James Goldsmith, and his partner Lady Annabel Goldsmith. Her parents married in 1978, having been previously married to other partners. Her father belonged to the Goldsmith family, a prominent financial dynasty of German Jewish descent. James Goldsmith was a son of the Conservative MP Frank Goldsmith, and grandson of the tycoon Adolphe Goldschmidt. His grand-uncle was the German banker Maximilian von Goldschmidt-Rothschild. His brother (Jemima's paternal uncle) was the environmentalist Edward Goldsmith. Edward's daughter (Jemima's paternal cousin) is the French actress Clio Goldsmith.

Jemima's mother belongs to an aristocratic Anglo-Irish family. Her maternal great-grandfather and great-grandmother were the 7th Marquess of Londonderry and Edith Vane-Tempest-Stewart (daughter of Henry Chaplin) respectively, maternal grandfather was the 8th Marquess of Londonderry, while her maternal uncle was the late 9th Marquess of Londonderry.

Jemima has two younger brothers, Zac Goldsmith and Ben Goldsmith, and five paternal and three maternal half-siblings, including Robin Birley and India Jane Birley.

Reham Khan's family
Reham's parents, Dr. Nayyar Ramzan and his wife, moved to Libya in the late 1960s, where Reham was born in Ajdabiya in 1973. Reham has two sisters and a brother. She is also the niece of Abdul Hakeem Khan, a former governor of the Khyber Pakhtunkhwa province as well as former Chief Justice of the Peshawar High Court. Reham had three children from her previous cousin marriage to British Pakistani psychiatrist Ijaz Rehman, to whom Imran Khan was a step-father; a son, Sahir Rehman (b. 1993) and two daughters, Ridha Rehman (b. 1997) and Inaya Rehman (b. 2003).

Bushra Imran's family
Bushra was born to a conservative, politically influential family of central Punjab. She belongs to the Punjabi clan of Wattoo, and originates from the town of Pakpattan. Her elder sister, Maryam Riaz Wattoo, is an influential member of PTI, having served as President of the UAE women's wing, and was responsible for Bushra's introduction to Khan. Her brother, Ahmed Wattoo, is a landowner and real estate developer in Lahore.

See also
 Pets of Imran Khan

References

Bibliography 

 
 

 
Pashtun families
Political families of Pakistan
Pakistani families
Cricketing families of Pakistan
Families of national leaders
Family by person